Root: A Game of Woodland Might and Right is a 2018 asymmetric board game designed by Cole Wehrle, illustrated by Kyle Ferrin, and published by Leder Games. In Root, players compete for the most victory points through moving and battling using varying functions with unique abilities. Upon its release, Root received positive reviews, and was followed by four expansions. A digital version, developed by Dire Wolf Digital, was released in 2020.

Gameplay 
In Root, 2-4 players compete in an asymmetric wargame to control a forest. Each player controls a different faction, each of which has different gameplay elements, tactics, and point scoring options. In the base game, 4 factions are present: the Eyrie, Marquise de Cat, Woodland Alliance, and the Vagabond. While there is a common set of rules for movement, hands of cards, and battling each other, every faction adds an additional layer of rules complexity.

Players who select the Eyrie take their turns by planning their actions in a specific order as part of the decree, requiring them to take specific actions in specific areas of the board. Each round the player adds new cards to the decree, until they are unable to take a prescribed action, which causes them to lose victory points and reset their decree to the minimum. The Marquise de Cat requires its player to construct buildings across the board - gaining wood via sawmills to construct other types of buildings and add combat units to the board. The Woodland Alliance starts with no units on the board, instead adding sympathy tokens, gaining supporter cards, and adding a small number of warriors to the board when given the opportunity. Unlike the other factions, the Vagabond has no warrior units, instead controlling just one piece around the board. The Vagabond player can purchase items from other players and either befriend or attack them to earn victory points.

Reception 
Root received critical success upon its release. Reviewing for Ars Technica, Charlie Theel praised the game's visuals and highlighted its strategic depth and asymmetrical factions. He described the Eyrie's design of adding decrees as a "fascinating and one of the most rewarding factions" that was "beset with challenges", the Marquise de Cat as "the most straightforward" but "deceptive", and considered the Woodland Alliance to be "a true guerilla force", with its power of destroying enemies to be "explosive and extremely gratifying". Theel concluded that the game offered "astounding depth" due to its "deep asymmetry" and "extended exploration". Jonathan Bolding from GamesRadar stated that it was "one of the best board games", praising the components, the accessible combat system, and "compelling" asymmetry, but commented negatively on the difficulty for new players. Similarly, Tom Mendelsohn commended the strategy, strategy depth, and "whimsical exterior". In a 2017 preview of the game, Destructoid commented favourably on the game's artwork; especially the contrast between cartoon animals and the mature themes of the game. Dicebreaker also listed Root as one of the best board games, describing the "absolutely adorable" artwork and balanced powers of the factions. In 2022, The New York Times named it one of the four best strategy board games alongside Brass: Birmingham, Ark Nova and Lost Ruins of Arnak, praising its "unique ecosystem of conflicting and contrasting goals, powers, and win conditions" but noting that it was "an intimidating game for newbies". 

Root also received numerous awards, including the 2018 Golden Geek Board Game of the Year award, the 2019 Origins Awards for Game of the Year, Best Board Game and Fan Favourite Board Game, and the American Tabletop Awards Complex Game award and the Spiel Portugal Jogo do Ano. It was also nominated for the 2020 As d’Or Expert award.

Expansions 
Root: The Riverfolk Expansion was released in 2018. The expansion adds two new factions (the Riverfolk Company and the Lizard Cult), the ability to play with a second Vagabond, and the ability to play with a bot version of the Marquise de Cat. A digital adaptation of the expansion was released in April 2021.

Root: The Underworld Expansion was released in 2020. The expansion adds two new factions, the Underground Duchy and the Corvid Conspiracy, as well as two additional maps.

Root: The Clockwork Expansion was released in 2020. The expansion allows players to play against bot versions of all four of the factions that were included in the base game.

Root: The Exiles and Partisans Deck was released in 2020. This deck can be swapped with the deck from the original game to add variety.

Root: The Vagabond Pack was released in 2020. The pack includes seven new vagabond playing pieces as well as three new character cards for the Vagabond.

Root: The Marauder Expansion was released in 2022. The expansion includes two new factions, the Lord of the Hundreds and the Keepers in Iron, as well as adding the hirelings mechanic and four hirelings.

Root: The Landmarks Pack was released in 2022. The pack includes 4 new landmarks as well as setup cards for the 2 existing ones.

Root: Marauder Hirelings and Hirelings Box was released in 2022. The expansion added the hireling versions of the Marauder Factions and one more. It also added a box for all hirelings.

Root: Riverfolk Hirelings Pack was released in 2022. The pack added the hireling versions of the Riverfolk Factions and one more.

Root: Underworld Hirelings Pack was released in 2022. The pack added the hireling versions of the Underworld Factions and one more.

Digital edition 
Root: Digital Edition was released in September 2020 by Dire Wolf on the PC, iOS and Android platforms, followed by a Nintendo Switch version in November 2021. The PC version was praised by Jason Ornleas from GamingTrend, who praised the tutorial, aesthetics, soundtrack and strategy, but criticised the quickness of the AI turns and the lack of an undo button. In their list of the best board games of 2020, Vulture named the digital version of Root as the best board game app, complimenting the animations, AI, and in-game tutorial. Theel from Polygon also recommended the Nintendo Switch adaptation, praised the addition of new modes, and concluded that it "accomplishes the unenviable task of bringing its machinations to the screen", but critiqued the lack of group dynamics.

See also 
 Oath: Chronicles of Empire and Exile, a subsequent board game designed by Cole Wehrle
 Pax Pamir, another board game designed by Cole Wehrle

References

External links 
 Root page on the Leder Games website
 

Asymmetric board games
Board games introduced in 2018
Kickstarter-funded tabletop games
Origins Award winners